Lancetes is a genus of predaceous diving beetles in the family Dytiscidae, the only member of the subfamily Lancetinae. There are more than 20 described species in Lancetes, found in Australasia and the Neotropics.

Species
These 22 species belong to the genus Lancetes:

 Lancetes angusticollis (Curtis, 1839)
 Lancetes arauco Bachmann & Trémouilles, 1981
 Lancetes backstromi Zimmermann, 1924
 Lancetes biremis Ríha, 1961
 Lancetes borellii Griffini, 1895
 Lancetes dacunhae Brinck, 1948
 Lancetes delkeskampi Ríha, 1961
 Lancetes falklandicus Ríha, 1961
 Lancetes flavipes Zimmermann, 1924
 Lancetes flavoscutatus Enderlein, 1912
 Lancetes immarginatus Zimmermann, 1924
 Lancetes lanceolatus (Clark, 1863)
 Lancetes marginatus (Steinheil, 1869)
 Lancetes mixtus (C.O. Waterhouse, 1881)
 Lancetes nigriceps (Erichson, 1834)
 Lancetes praemorsus (Erichson, 1834)
 Lancetes subseriatus Zimmermann, 1924
 Lancetes tarsalis Ríha, 1961
 Lancetes theresae Sharp, 1902
 Lancetes towianicus Zimmermann, 1924
 Lancetes varius (Fabricius, 1775)
 Lancetes waterhousei Griffini, 1895

References

Further reading

 
 
 

Dytiscidae genera